Neil Armour (born 14 January 1967) is a Scottish former footballer. He played in defence for clubs in Scotland, China, Hong Kong and the United States.

Player
In April 2000, Armour had unsuccessful trials with the Hershey Wildcats and Lehigh Valley Steam of the second division USL A-League. He then moved west to sign with the third division Riverside County Elite as a player-assistant coach. The Elite played in the USL D-3 Pro League. On 24 June 2000, he transferred to the Utah Blitzz.

Coach
He has coached at Yee Hope, Riverside County Elite and the Utah Blitzz. Since retirement he has been coaching the junior sides of Orange County Surf Soccer Club in America. Armour currently coaches the OC Surf boys under 14 team, OC Surf girls under 13 team, and the OC Surf girls under 15 team.

References

External links

www.westcoastfc.org/about-wcfc/coaching/neil-armour

1967 births
Living people
Eastern Sports Club footballers
Guangzhou F.C. players
Happy Valley AA players
Kilbirnie Ladeside F.C. players
Scottish footballers
Scottish expatriate footballers
Stranraer F.C. players
Utah Blitzz players
Yee Hope players
Expatriate footballers in China
British expatriates in China
Expatriate footballers in Hong Kong
Scottish expatriate sportspeople in Hong Kong
Riverside County Elite players
Greenock Morton F.C. players
Albion Rovers F.C. players
Scottish Football League players
Association football defenders
Footballers from Irvine, North Ayrshire
Scottish expatriate sportspeople in the United States
Expatriate soccer players in the United States